Margaret Morris may refer to:
Margaret Morris (actress) (1898–1968), American actress
Margaret Morris (dancer) (1891–1980), British dancer
Maggie Morris, Canadian radio and television personality of the 1960s
Margie Morris (1892-1983), Anglo-Dutch performer
Margaret Hill Morris (1737-1816), American Quaker healer and diarist

See also 
Margaretta Morris (1797–1867), American entomologist